Parappadi is a village in the Elangulam panchayatTirunelveli district of Tamil Nadu, India.

Villages in Tirunelveli district